JaKeenan Tyelle Gant (born May 6, 1996) is an American professional basketball player for Chorale Roanne Basket of the LNB Pro A. He played college basketball for the Missouri Tigers and the Louisiana Ragin' Cajuns.

Early life and high school career
Gant was born in Savannah, Georgia and grew up in the nearby city of Springfield, where he attended Effingham County High School. Gant averaged 17.9 points, 9.3 rebounds and 4.2 blocks per game in his junior season and was named the Region 3-5A and Georgia Class 5A Player of the Year as the Rebels reached the GHSA state semifinals. He averaged 21 points, 10.5 rebounds, four blocks, 2.8 assists and one steal per game as a senior and was again named 5A Player of the Year as well as Mr. Georgia Basketball. Rated a consensus four-star recruit, Gant was ranked as one of the top 60 college prospects in his class and in the top ten at his position. He committed to played college basketball at Missouri going into his senior year over offers from Alabama, Georgia, Florida, Louisville, and Indiana.

College career

Missouri
Gant played in 23 games (six starts) as a freshman, averaging 4.9 points and 2.2 rebounds per game and shot 51.6 percent on field goal attempts. He missed nine games due to a suspension after he and fellow freshman Tiger D'Angelo Allen were arrested on suspicion of third-degree assault. As a sophomore Gant averaged 5.1 points and 3.8 rebounds per game, again primarily off the bench. Gant was suspended a second time by the team in February after he and teammate Russell Woods were both cited for possession of drug paraphernalia. Following the season, Gant announced that he would be leaving the program in order to move closer to home after his mother was diagnosed with an undisclosed health issue.

Louisiana
Gant ultimately transferred to the University of Louisiana at Lafayette. After sitting out one year due to NCAA transfer rules, Gant immediately stepped in as a starter for the Ragin' Cajuns the following season and was named the Sun Belt Conference Newcomer of the Year, Defensive Player of the Year, and third team All-Conference after averaging 13.7 points, 5.8 rebounds and 2.3 blocks per game. As a redshirt senior, Gant garnered first team All-Sun Belt honors and was again named Defensive Player of the Year after averaging 20.5 points per game (third-highest in the conference) and leading the conference with 8.7 rebounds and 2.6 blocked shots.

Professional career

Fort Wayne Mad Ants (2019–2020)
Gant worked out for several teams leading up to the 2019 NBA Draft, but ultimately went unselected. Gant signed an Exhibit 10 contract with the Indiana Pacers on July 1, 2019. Gant was waived by the Pacers on October 9, 2019. After being waived, Gant joined the Pacers' NBA G League affiliate, the Fort Wayne Mad Ants. In his first professional season, Gant averaged  8.0 points, 3.7 rebounds and 1.1 blocks per game.

Ulsan Mobis Phoebus (2020)
On June 16, 2020, Gant signed with Ulsan Mobis Phoebus of the Korean Basketball League. In 25 games, he averaged 9.4 points, 4.0 rebounds and 0.8 blocks in 12.9 minutes.

Second stint with Fort Wayne (2021)
On January 11, 2021, Gant returned to the Fort Wayne Mad Ants. In 3 games, he averaged 2.3 points, 0.3 rebounds and 0.3 assists in 5.2 minutes.

Saskatchewan Rattlers (2021)
On May 12, 2021, Gant signed with the Saskatchewan Rattlers of the Canadian Elite Basketball League.

Chorale Roanne Basket (2021–present)
On July 9, 2021, he has signed with Chorale Roanne Basket of the LNB Pro A.

References

External links
Louisiana Ragin Cajuns bio
Missouri Tigers bio

1996 births
Living people
21st-century African-American sportspeople
African-American basketball players
American expatriate basketball people in South Korea
American men's basketball players
Basketball players from Georgia (U.S. state)
Chorale Roanne Basket players
Fort Wayne Mad Ants players
Louisiana Ragin' Cajuns men's basketball players
Missouri Tigers men's basketball players
People from Effingham County, Georgia
Power forwards (basketball)
Ulsan Hyundai Mobis Phoebus players